Nunapitchuk  is a city in Bethel Census Area, Alaska, United States. At the 2010 census the population was 496, up from 466 in 2000.

Geography
Nunapitchuk is located at  (60.896352, -162.454383).

Demographics

Nunapitchuk first appeared on the 1940 U.S. Census as the unincorporated native village of "Nunatpichuk" (apparently erroneously spelled). It was returned as Nunapitchuk in 1950 and 1960. In 1969, Nunapitchuk and the neighboring village of Kasigluk were merged to form the city of Akolmiut. (See City of Akolmiut below) In 1982, both communities decided to dissolve Akolmiut and become separate cities again. Nunapitchuk returned again beginning on the 1990 census and in every successive census to date (2010).

As of the census of 2000, there were 466 people, 105 households, and 91 families residing in the city. There were 120 housing units at an average density of 15.3 per square mile (5.9/km2). The racial makeup of the city was 3.43% White, 95.49% Native American, 0.43% Asian, 0.21% from other races, and 0.43% from two or more races.

There were 105 households, out of which 67.6% had children under the age of 18 living with them, 67.6% were married couples living together, 11.4% had a female householder with no husband present, and 12.4% were non-families. 10.5% of all households were made up of individuals, and 1.9% had someone living alone who was 65 years of age or older.  The average household size was 4.44 and the average family size was 4.88.

In the city, the age distribution of the population shows 41.8% under the age of 18, 10.3% from 18 to 24, 27.7% from 25 to 44, 15.7% from 45 to 64, and 4.5% who were 65 years of age or older.  The median age was 23 years. For every 100 females, there were 109.9 males.  For every 100 females age 18 and over, there were 115.1 males.

The median income for a household in the city was $29,286, and the median income for a family was $30,313. Males had a median income of $16,250 versus $36,250 for females. The per capita income for the city was $8,364.  About 14.6% of families and 20.7% of the population were below the poverty line, including 29.9% of those under age 18 and none of those age 65 or over.

City of Akolmiut (1969-1982)

The former city of Akolmiut was the result of the consolidation of neighboring villages of Nunapitchuk and Kasigluk incorporating into a city in 1969. After appearing on the 1970 and 1980 censuses, the communities decided to separate themselves back into two independent cities again in 1982, resuming their former names.

Life in Nunapitchuk
Nunapitchuk is part of the Yukon-Kuskokwim Delta, and as such sits on swampy tundra.  There are no roads to or within Nunapitchuk; buildings are connected by a network of boardwalks.  The village is accessible by small aircraft, boats, and hovercraft  , as weather permits.

The village's grocery and fuel needs are served by a single general store, owned and operated by the local Alaska Native Corporation, Nunapitchuk, Limited. Many locals also practice subsistence fishing and hunting.

The city regularly experiences flooding. In May 2020, historic flooding caused significant damage.

Education
Lower Kuskokwim School District operates the Anna Tobeluk Memorial School, K-12.  the school had 203 students, 15 certified teachers, and 16 classified employees. English is the sole language of instruction at Tobeluk.

References

External links
 Nunapitchuk Public School  (photos and first-hand discussion of the village.)

Cities in Alaska
Cities in Bethel Census Area, Alaska